This article is a list of diseases of geraniums (Pelargonium).

Bacterial diseases

Fungal diseases

Virus diseases

Nematodes, parasitic

Miscellaneous diseases and disorders

References
Common Names of Diseases, The American Phytopathological Society

Geranium
Ornamental plant pathogens and diseases
Diseases, List of